Events in the year 1943 in India.

Incumbents
 Emperor of India – George VI
 Viceroy of India – Victor Hope, 2nd Marquess of Linlithgow 
 Viceroy of India – The Viscount Wavell (from 1 October)

Events
 National income - 69,247 million
 Bengal famine of 1943
 10 February – 3 March – Mohandas Gandhi maintains a hunger strike to protest his imprisonment.
 5 December – The Japanese attack the Port of Kolkata
 30 December – Subhas Chandra Bose sets up a pro-Japanese Indian government at Port Blair.

Law
Reciprocity Act
War Injuries (Compensation Insurance) Act

Births

January to June
1 January – Raghunath Anant Mashelkar, scientist.
8 February – Pirzada Qasim, Pakistani poet and academic
30 March – J. J. Rawal, astrophysicist and scientific educator.
25 April — Devika, actress (d. 2002).
29 May – Enamul Haque, Bangladeshi actor (d. 2021)
2 June – Ilaiyaraaja, film composer, singer and lyricist.
7 June - Rayapati Sambasiva Rao, politician and member of parliament from Narasaraopet.

July to December
13 July – E. Harikumar, novelist and short story writer. (died 2020)
29 July – Manas Bihari Verma, aeronautical scientist. (died 2021)
11 August – Pervez Musharraf, President of Pakistan. (died 2023)
29 August  Vijayakumar, actor.
6 September – P. A. Ibrahim Haji, entrepreneur and philanthropist. (died 2021)
23 September – Tanuja, actress of Bollywood films & younger sister of Nutan.
31 October – G. Madhavan Nair, Chairman of the Indian Space Research Organisation.
11 November – Anil Kakodkar, nuclear scientist.

Deaths
15 June – Kushal Konwar, Indian National Congress President of Golaghat, First martyr of Quit India Movement.

Full date unknown
Prameela Devi, actress (died 2002).

 
India
Years of the 20th century in India
India in World War II